Subfield may refer to: 

  an area of research and study within an academic discipline
  Field extension, used in field theory (mathematics)
  a Division (heraldry)
 a division in MARC standards